Khin is a Burmese name that may refer to the following notable people:
Khin Khin (disambiguation), multiple people
Khin Kyi (1912–1988), Burmese politician and diplomat
Khin Nyunt (born 1939), Burmese military officer and politician
Khin Thiri Thet Mon (born c.1982), Burmese businesswoman
Khin Wint Wah (born 1994), Burmese actress
Maung Khin (1872–1924), first Burmese Chief Justice of the High Court
Myint Myint Khin (born 1934), Burmese actress
Soe Khin (born 1950), Burmese long-distance runner

Burmese-language surnames
Burmese-language given names
Surnames of Burmese origin